Lilli Katriina Paasikivi-Ilves (born in 1965 in Imatra, Finland) is the artistic director of the Finnish National Opera since 2013 and a mezzo-soprano.

In her work, Paasikivi has set out to reshape the structures of opera and to find ways to combine technology with opera. In 2019, Paasikivi launched Opera Beyond – a project which aims to apply new technological possibilities and tools in opera and ballet.

Her roles have included Marguerite (in Opera North's La damnation de Faust ) and Octavian (in Der Rosenkavalier). She has also performed as Fricka in Das Rheingold with the Berlin Philharmonic under Sir Simon Rattle. In 2007, she performed as Ariel in Sibelius's incidental music to The Tempest at the Royal Albert Hall, London, in the 42nd BBC Prom. In April 2008, she performed Ernest Chausson's Poème de l'amour et de la mer with the Melbourne Symphony Orchestra. In November 2008, she sang Elgar's Sea Pictures and The Dream of Gerontius with the Sydney Symphony Orchestra under Vladimir Ashkenazy.

In 2016 Paasikivi founded the Sydänkesän säveliä festival in Kisko, Southwest Finland. She was the artistic director of the Pyhäniemen kartano concert series in 2010-2015.

Paasikivi was awarded the Pro Finlandia Medal in recognition of her artistic merits in 2008 and the Commander’s Badge by the Order of The Lion of Finland in 2017.

Partial discography

 Sibelius, Kullervo, Op. 7 with Osmo Vänskä conducting the Lahti Symphony Orchestra with the Helsinki University Chorus with Raimo Laukka
 Sibelius, incidental music to Belshazzar's Feast, with the Lahti Symphony Orchestra under Osmo Vänskä
 Sibelius, incidental music to The Tempest with the Lahti Symphony Orchestra under Osmo Vänskä
 Sibelius, The Maiden in the Tower with the Estonian Symphony Orchestra under Paavo Järvi
 Stravinsky, Le sacre du printemps and Mavra with the Gothenburg Symphony under Benjamin Zander
 Gustav Mahler, Symphony No. 3 and No. 2 with the Cincinnati Symphony Orchestra and London Symphony Orchestra under Paavo Järvi
 Alma Mahler, Complete Songs with the Tampere Philharmonic Orchestra, conducted by Jorma Panula
 Einojuhani Rautavaara, Rasputin, recorded with Finnish National Opera Orchestra and Chorus conducted by Mikko Franck, together with Jorma Hynninen (baritone), Jyrki Anttila (tenor), Riikka Rantanen (mezzo-soprano), Ritva-Liisa Korhonen (soprano), Jyrki Korhonen (bass), Gabriel Suovanen (baritone), Matti Salminen (bass), and Lassi Virtanen (tenor)
 Kunniaa veisatkaa joulukonsertti (with other artists)
 Joulu tullut on (Finnish Christmas songs), with conductor Ulf Söderblom and the Jyväskylä Sinfonia
 Äidiltä Lapselle, with Pentti Kotiranta (piano)
 Elgar, The Dream of Gerontius, with Vladimir Ashkenazy conducting the Sydney Symphony Orchestra and Mark Tucker and David Wilson-Johnson (baritone). Nominated for an ARIA Award in 2012.

References

External links
Official representation
Lilli-Paasikivi Operabase
Discography on Ondine

Finnish operatic mezzo-sopranos
1965 births
Living people
People from Imatra
20th-century Finnish women opera singers
21st-century Finnish women opera singers